Psilotrichum is a genus of flowering plants in the family Amaranthaceae. There are about 18 species, most native to Africa.

Species include:
 Psilotrichum aphyllum
Psilotrichum erythrostachyum 
Psilotrichum ferrugineum 
Psilotrichum scleranthum
Psilotrichum sericeum
Psilotrichum yunnanense

References

 
Amaranthaceae genera
Taxonomy articles created by Polbot